Siege of Mainz may refer to:
Siege of Mainz (1689), a siege under Jacques Henri de Durfort de Duras during the Nine Years' War
Siege of Mainz (1792), a siege by the French Revolutionary Armies under Custine
Siege of Mainz (1793), a siege by the armies of the First Coalition, recapture by the French and major destruction to the city architecture
Battle of Mainz, a 1795 siege of the city by the French Revolutionary Armies
Siege of Mainz (1814), a siege under Charles Antoine Morand by the armies of the Sixth Coalition which damaged Mainz-Kostheim

See also
 Timeline of Mainz